Acallurothrips is a genus of thrips in the family Phlaeothripidae.

Species
 Acallurothrips amplus
 Acallurothrips badius
 Acallurothrips breviceps
 Acallurothrips brunneus
 Acallurothrips casuarinae
 Acallurothrips conifer
 Acallurothrips fasciolatus
 Acallurothrips flavus
 Acallurothrips hagai
 Acallurothrips hanatanii
 Acallurothrips judithae
 Acallurothrips latus
 Acallurothrips louisianae
 Acallurothrips macrurus
 Acallurothrips mamillicauda
 Acallurothrips metulicauda
 Acallurothrips nogutti
 Acallurothrips nonakai
 Acallurothrips quadraticeps
 Acallurothrips spinicauda
 Acallurothrips spinurus
 Acallurothrips tubullatus

References

Phlaeothripidae
Thrips
Thrips genera